The men's 600 metre team military rifle, prone was a shooting sports event held as part of the Shooting at the 1920 Summer Olympics programme. It was the third (and last) appearance for military rifle events but the first time that medals were awarded for teams in the prone position. The competition was held on 29 and 30 July and on 2 August 1920. 70 shooters from 14 nations competed.

Results

The scores of the five shooters were summed to give a team score. The maximum score was 300. Two shoot-offs were necessary to find the winning team.

References

External links
 Official Report
 

Shooting at the 1920 Summer Olympics